Julia Saner (born February 19, 1992) is a Swiss model. She celebrated her first international success in 2006 as Tap Dance Junior World Champion in the category "Junior Small Group". In 2009, she won International Elle Model Look contest.

Early life
Julia Saner was born on February 19, 1992, in  Bern, Switzerland, but currently residing in United Kingdom.

Career
Julia debut in 2010 when she walked for Gucci at the spring show in Milan. She has also walked for Fendi, Moschino, D&G, Roberto Cavalli, MaxMara and Salvatore Ferrgarno. Julia works modeling with several agencies as Elite Stockholm, Model Management Hamburg, Elite Copenhagen, Elite Barcelona, Elite London and Elite Paris.

Awards
 International Elle Model Look contest (2009)

References

External links
 Isabella Julia Saner at supermodels.nl

1992 births
Living people
Swiss female models